Kalray is a fabless semiconductor company.

Founded in 2008 as a spin-off of CEA French lab, with investors such as Renault–Nissan–Mitsubishi Alliance, Safran, NXP Semiconductors, CEA and Bpifrance.

Product history 
The first Kalray patent was filed in 2010. Today the company holds more than 30 patent families, including 2 families with an exclusive CEA license.

On 22 June 2015, Kalray began the distribution of data center acceleration board families: TurboCard and KONIC, for networking and storage applications, both of which can be programmed with either standard C or C++. TurboCard and KONIC both utilize the MPPA2-256 Bostan second generation processor.

Kalray chips 
Kalray chips are code-named after Mountains. However each chip is called a "MPPA" for "Massively Parallel Processor Array":

MPPA-256 Andey 
Produced in 2013 in CMOS 28HP technology from TSMC, this SoC (or System-on-Chip) runs at 400 MHz and contains 256 VLIW processing cores.

MPPA2-256 Bostan 
Produced in 2015 with the same CMOS 28HP technology from TSMC, this SoC running at 550 MHz was enhanced to increase the floating-point performance of the VLIW cores, to natively support the Linux operating system, and to process high-speed Ethernet (up to 80 Gbit/s). Each VLIW core was extended with a tightly coupled cryptographic coprocessor for security protocol acceleration.

MPPA2.2-256 Bostan2 
Produced in 2017, this processor is based on the previous generation, Bostan, with an improved DDR controller, Ethernet controller and PCIe controller. As a result, this processor fully supports the NVM Express (NVMe) standard interface (for connecting hosts to PCIe bus-attached SSDs), and also the NVMe over Fabrics standard using RDMA (for connections between servers, storage controllers, and NVMe enclosures).

MPPA3-80 Coolidge 
The third-generation MPPA processor Coolidge has been released. Based on TSMC 16 nm FinFET process technology, this processor includes 80 64-bit VLIW processing cores distributed among 5 clusters, 8x 25 Gbit/s Ethernet and 16x PCIe Gen4 interfaces. Each VLIW core is extended with a tightly coupled tensor co-processor for deep learning application acceleration.

Listing on Euronext 
In 2017, ahead of the launch of Kalray's third-generation microprocessor, Safran and Pengpai joined the company's historical investors (mainly CEA Investissement, ACE, INOCAP). In 2018, Alliance Ventures (strategic venture capital fund operated by Renault-Nissan-Mitsubishi) and Definvest (an investment fund managed by Bpifrance on behalf of the French Ministry of Armed Forces) also acquired stakes in Kalray.

On June 12, 2018, Kalray launched its IPO on the Euronext Paris Stock Market and raised €47.7M (after exercise of the over-allocation option), "the most significant IPO since Euronext Growth was created in Paris."

References 

French companies established in 2008
Semiconductor companies of France